The 1888 United States House of Representatives elections were held for the most part on November 6, 1888, with three states holding theirs early between June and September. They occurred at the same time as the election of President Benjamin Harrison. Elections were initially held for 325 seats of the United States House of Representatives, representing 38 states, to serve in the 51st United States Congress. Six new states would later join the union and increase the House to 332 seats. Special elections were also held throughout the year.

Harrison's Republican Party gained a majority in the House at the expense of the Democratic Party, even though incumbent President Grover Cleveland actually received more votes counted than Harrison. However, as in other elections in the period, widespread vote suppression and fraud was common on behalf of Democrats and against black Republicans in the South. The Republican House majority in uncontested elections unseated a number of initially reported as victorious Democratic candidates in favor of Republican candidates who contested their election loss. The issue of tariffs played a key role in this election. The Democrats, with the support of farmers and laborers, wanted to lower tariffs in order to promote free trade, while the Republicans, backed by industry and big business, believed that higher tariffs were necessary to protect American manufacturing. Especially in industrializing regions, voters chose the Republican view on tariffs, as they gave the party a slim majority in the House.

Election summaries
Seven seats were added, for the six new states of, in order of admission (number of House seats for each new state listed in parentheses): North Dakota (1), South Dakota (2), Montana (1), Washington (1), Idaho (1), and Wyoming (1).

The previous election had 4 third-party candidates, 2 Labor, 1 Greenback, and 1 Independent.

Election dates
All states elected their members November 6, 1888 except, three states, with 7 seats among them:

 June 6: Oregon
 September 4: Vermont
 September 10: Maine

Alabama

Arizona Territory 
See Non-voting delegates, below.

Arkansas 

|-
! 
| Poindexter Dunn
|  | Democratic
| 1878
|  | Incumbent retired.New member elected.Democratic hold.
| nowrap | 

|-
! 
| Clifton R. Breckinridge
|  | Democratic
| 1882
| Incumbent re-elected.
| nowrap | 

|-
! 
| Thomas C. McRae
|  | Democratic
| 1884
| Incumbent re-elected.
| nowrap | 

|-
! 
| John H. Rogers
|  | Democratic
| 1884
| Incumbent re-elected.
| nowrap | 

|-
! 
| Samuel W. Peel
|  | Democratic
| 1884
| Incumbent re-elected.
| nowrap | 

|}

John M. Clayton successfully contested the election, but was assassinated before the contest was complete, so the House declared the seat vacant. Breckinridge was subsequently re-elected November 4, 1890 to finish the term.

California 

|-
! 
| Thomas Larkin Thompson
|  | Democratic
| 1886
|  | Incumbent lost re-election.New member elected.Republican gain.
| nowrap | 

|-
! 
| Marion Biggs
|  | Democratic
| 1886
| Incumbent re-elected.
| nowrap | 

|-
! 
| Joseph McKenna
|  | Republican
| 1884
| Incumbent re-elected.
| nowrap | 

|-
! 
| William W. Morrow
|  | Republican
| 1884
| Incumbent re-elected.
| nowrap | 

|-
! 
| Charles N. Felton
|  | Republican
| 1884
|  | Incumbent retired.New member elected.Democratic gain.
| nowrap | 

|-
! 
| William Vandever
|  | Republican
| 1886
|  | Incumbent retired.New member elected.Republican hold
| nowrap | 

|}

Colorado

Connecticut

Delaware

Florida 

|-
! 
| Robert H. M. Davidson
|  | Democratic
| 1876
| Incumbent re-elected.
| nowrap | 

|-
! 
| Charles Dougherty
|  | Democratic
| 1884
|  | Incumbent retired.New member elected.Democratic hold
| nowrap | 

|}

Idaho Territory 
See Non-voting delegates, below.

Illinois

Indiana

Iowa

Kansas

Kentucky

Louisiana

Maine

Maryland

Massachusetts 

|-
! 
| Robert T. Davis
|  | Republican
| 1882
|  |Incumbent retired.New member elected.Republican hold.
| nowrap | 

|-
! 
| John Davis Long
|  | Republican
| 1882
|  |Incumbent retired.New member elected.Republican hold.
| nowrap | 

|-
! 
| Leopold Morse
|  | Democratic
| 1886
|  |Incumbent retired.New member elected.Democratic hold.
| nowrap | 

|-
! 
| Patrick Collins
|  | Democratic
| 1882
|  |Incumbent retired.New member elected.Democratic hold.
| 

|-
! 
| Edward D. Hayden
|  | Republican
| 1886
|  |Incumbent retired.New member elected.Republican hold.
| nowrap | 

|-
! 
| Henry Cabot Lodge
|  | Republican
| 1886
| Incumbent re-elected.
| nowrap | 

|-
! 
| William Cogswell
|  | Republican
| 1886
| Incumbent re-elected.
| nowrap | 

|-
! 
| Charles Herbert Allen
|  | Republican
| 1886
|  |Incumbent not re-nominated.New member elected.Republican hold.
| nowrap | 

|-
! 
| Edward Burnett
|  | Democratic
| 1886
|  | Incumbent lost re-election.New member elected.Republican gain.
| nowrap | 

|-
! 
| John E. Russell
|  | Democratic
| 1886
|  | Incumbent retired.New member elected.Republican gain.
| nowrap | 

|-
! 
| William Whiting II
|  | Republican
| 1882
| Incumbent re-elected.
| nowrap | 

|-
! 
| Francis W. Rockwell
|  | Republican
| 1884
| Incumbent re-elected.
| nowrap | 

|}

Michigan

Minnesota

Mississippi 

|-
! 
| John M. Allen
|  | Democratic
| 1884
| Incumbent re-elected.
| nowrap | 

|-
! 
| James B. Morgan
|  | Democratic
| 1884
| Incumbent re-elected.
| nowrap | 

|-
! 
| Thomas C. Catchings
|  | Democratic
| 1884
| Incumbent re-elected.
| nowrap | 

|-
! 
| Frederick G. Barry
|  | Democratic
| 1884
|  | Incumbent retired.New member elected.Democratic hold.
| nowrap | 

|-
! 
| Chapman L. Anderson
|  | Democratic
| 1886
| Incumbent re-elected.
| nowrap | 

|-
! 
| T. R. Stockdale
|  | Democratic
| 1886
| Incumbent re-elected.
| nowrap | 

|-
! 
| Charles E. Hooker
|  | Democratic
| 1886
| Incumbent re-elected.
| nowrap | 

|}

Missouri

Nebraska 

|-
! 
| John A. McShane
|  | Democratic
| 1886
|  | Incumbent retired to run for U.S. senator.New member elected.Republican gain.
| nowrap | 

|-
! 
| James Laird
|  | Republican 
| 1882
| Incumbent re-elected.
| nowrap | 

|-
! 
| George W. E. Dorsey
|  | Republican 
| 1884
| Incumbent re-elected.
| nowrap | 

|}

Nevada

New Hampshire

New Jersey

Montana Territory 
See Non-voting delegates, below.

New Mexico Territory 
See Non-voting delegates, below.

New York

North Carolina

Ohio

|-
! 
| Benjamin Butterworth
|  | Republican
| 1884
| Incumbent re-elected.
| nowrap | 

|-
! 
| Charles Elwood Brown
|  | Republican
| 1884
|  | Incumbent retired.New member elected.Republican hold.
| nowrap | 

|-
! 
| Elihu S. Williams
|  | Republican
| 1886
| Incumbent re-elected.
| nowrap | 

|-
! 
| Samuel S. Yoder
|  | Democratic
| 1886
| Incumbent re-elected.
| nowrap | 

|-
! 
| George E. Seney
|  | Democratic
| 1886
| Incumbent re-elected.
| nowrap | 

|-
! 
| Melvin M. Boothman
|  | Republican
| 1886
| Incumbent re-elected.
| nowrap | 

|-
! 
| James E. Campbell
|  | Democratic
| 1886
|  | Incumbent retired.New member elected.Republican gain.
| nowrap | 

|-
! 
| Robert P. Kennedy
|  | Republican
| 1886
| Incumbent re-elected.
| nowrap | 

|-
! 
| William C. Cooper
|  | Republican
| 1884
| Incumbent re-elected.
| nowrap | 

|-
! 
| Jacob Romeis
|  | Republican
| 1884
|  | Incumbent lost re-election.New member elected.Democratic gain.
| nowrap | 

|-
! 
| Albert C. Thompson
|  | Republican
| 1886
| Incumbent re-elected.
| nowrap | 

|-
! 
| Jacob J. Pugsley
|  | Republican
| 1886
| Incumbent re-elected.
| nowrap | 

|-
! 
| Joseph H. Outhwaite
|  | Democratic
| 1884
| Incumbent re-elected.
| nowrap | 

|-
! 
| Charles P. Wickham
|  | Republican
| 1886
| Incumbent re-elected.
| nowrap | 

|-
! 
| Charles H. Grosvenor
|  | Republican
| 1886
| Incumbent re-elected.
| nowrap | 

|-
! 
| Beriah Wilkins
|  | Democratic
| 1886
|  | Incumbent retired.New member elected.Democratic hold.
| nowrap | 

|-
! 
| Joseph D. Taylor
|  | Republican
| 1886
| Incumbent re-elected.
| nowrap | 

|-
! 
| William McKinley
|  | Republican
| 1886
| Incumbent re-elected.
| nowrap | 

|-
! 
| Ezra B. Taylor
|  | Republican
| 1880 (s)
| Incumbent re-elected.
| nowrap | 

|-
! 
| George W. Crouse
|  | Republican
| 1886
|  | Incumbent retired.New member elected.Republican Hold
| nowrap | 

|-
! 
| Martin A. Foran
|  | Democratic
| 1882
|  | Incumbent retired.New member elected.Republican gain.
| nowrap | 

|}

Oregon

Pennsylvania

Rhode Island

South Carolina 

|-
! 
| Samuel Dibble
|  | Democratic
| 1882
| Incumbent re-elected.
| nowrap | 

|-
! 
| George D. Tillman
|  | Democratic
| 1878
| Incumbent re-elected.
| nowrap | 

|-
! 
| James S. Cothran
|  | Democratic
| 1886
| Incumbent re-elected.
| nowrap | 

|-
! 
| William H. Perry
|  | Democratic
| 1884
| Incumbent re-elected.
| nowrap | 

|-
! 
| John J. Hemphill
|  | Democratic
| 1882
| Incumbent re-elected.
| nowrap | 

|-
! 
| George W. Dargan
|  | Democratic
| 1882
| Incumbent re-elected.
| nowrap | 

|-
! 
| William Elliott
|  | Democratic
| 1884
| Incumbent re-elected.
| nowrap | 

|}

Tennessee 

|-
! 
| Roderick R. Butler
|  | Republican
| 1886
|  |Incumbent retired.New member elected.Republican hold.
| nowrap | 

|-
! 
| Leonidas C. Houk
|  | Republican
| 1878
| Incumbent re-elected.
| nowrap | 

|-
! 
| John R. Neal
|  | Democratic
| 1884
|  |Incumbent retired.New member elected.Republican gain.
| nowrap | 

|-
! 
| Benton McMillin
|  | Democratic
| 1878
| Incumbent re-elected.
|  nowrap | 

|-
! 
| James D. Richardson
|  | Democratic
| 1884
| Incumbent re-elected.
| nowrap | 

|-
! 
| Joseph E. Washington
|  | Democratic
| 1886
| Incumbent re-elected.
| nowrap | 

|-
! 
| Washington C. Whitthorne
|  | Democratic
| 1886
| Incumbent re-elected.
| nowrap | 

|-
! 
| Benjamin A. Enloe
|  | Democratic
| 1886
| Incumbent re-elected.
| nowrap | 

|-
! 
| Presley T. Glass
|  | Democratic
| 1884
|  |Incumbent lost renomination.New member elected.Democratic hold.
| nowrap | 

|-
! 
| James Phelan Jr.
|  | Democratic
| 1886
| Incumbent re-elected.
| 

|}

Texas

Utah Territory 
See Non-voting delegates, below.

Vermont

Virginia

Washington Territory 
See Non-voting delegates, below.

West Virginia 

|-
! rowspan=2 | 
| rowspan=2 | Nathan Goff Jr.
| rowspan=2  | Republican
| rowspan=2 | 1882
|  | Incumbent retired.New member elected.Democratic gain.
| nowrap | 
|-
|  | Election successfully contested.New member seated February 26, 1890.Republican hold.
| nowrap | 

|-
! 
| William L. Wilson
|  | Democratic
| 1882
| Incumbent re-elected.
| nowrap | 

|-
! 
| Charles P. Snyder
|  | Democratic
| 1883 (special)
|  | Incumbent retired.New member elected.Democratic hold.
| nowrap | 

|-
! rowspan=2 |
| rowspan=2 | Charles E. Hogg
|  rowspan=2 | Democratic
| rowspan=2 | 1886
|  | Incumbent lost renomination.New member elected.Democratic hold.
| nowrap rowspan=2 | 
|-
|  | Election successfully contested.New member seated February 3, 1890.Republican gain.
|}

Wisconsin 

Wisconsin elected nine members of congress on Election Day, November 6, 1888.

|-
! 
| Lucien B. Caswell
|  | Republican
| 1884
| Incumbent re-elected.
| nowrap | 

|-
! 
| Richard W. Guenther
|  | Republican
| 1886
|  | Incumbent declined re-nomination.New member elected.Democratic gain.
| nowrap | 

|-
! 
| Robert M. La Follette
|  | Republican
| 1884
| Incumbent re-elected.
| nowrap | 

|-
! 
| Henry Smith
|  | Labor
| 1886
| |  Incumbent lost re-election.New member elected.Republican gain.
| nowrap | 

|-
! 
| Thomas R. Hudd
|  | Democratic
| 1886Special
| |  Incumbent lost re-nomination.New member elected.Democratic hold.
| nowrap | 

|-
! 
| Charles B. Clark
|  | Republican
| 1886
| Incumbent re-elected.
| nowrap | 

|-
! 
| Ormsby B. Thomas
|  | Republican
| 1884
| Incumbent re-elected.
| nowrap | 

|-
! 
| Nils P. Haugen
|  | Republican
| 1887
| Incumbent re-elected.
| nowrap | 

|-
! 
| Isaac Stephenson
|  | Republican
| 1882
| |  Incumbent declined re-nomination.New member elected.Republican hold.
| nowrap | 

|}

Wyoming Territory 
See Non-voting delegates, below.

Non-voting delegates 

|-
! 

|-
! 
| Fred Dubois
|  | Republican
| 1886
| Incumbent re-elected.
| nowrap | 

|-
! 
| Joseph K. Toole
|  | Democratic
| 1884
|  | Incumbent retired.New member elected.Republican gain.
| nowrap | 

|-
! 

|-
! 

|-
! 

|-
! 
| Joseph M. Carey
|  | Republican
| 1884
| Incumbent re-elected.
| nowrap | 

|}

See also
 1888 United States elections
 1888 United States presidential election
 1888–89 United States Senate elections
 50th United States Congress
 51st United States Congress

Notes

References

Bibliography

External links
 Office of the Historian (Office of Art & Archives, Office of the Clerk, U.S. House of Representatives)